{{DISPLAYTITLE:Eta1 Coronae Australis}}

Eta1 Coronae Australis, Latinized from η1 CrA, is a suspected astrometric binary star system in the constellation of Corona Australis. It is visible to the naked eye as a dim, white-hued point of light with an apparent visual magnitude of 5.456. Parallax measurements put it at a distance of 317 light-years away from the Sun.

The visible component is an A-type main-sequence star with a stellar classification of A3V, which indicates it is generating energy through core hydrogen fusion. It has broad spectrum absorption lines associated with its rotation period, having a projected rotational velocity of 122.3 km/s. The star is radiating 58 times the luminosity of the Sun from its photosphere at an effective temperature of 8,371 K.

References 

A-type main-sequence stars
Astrometric binaries

Corona Australis
Corona Australis, Eta1
Durchmusterung objects
7062
173715
092308